The following is a list of Soviet and post-Soviet serial killers nicknamed after Andrei Chikatilo, who sexually assaulted, murdered and mutilated at least 52 women as well as children of both genders between 1978 and his arrest in 1990.

List

Soviet

Post-Soviet

Notes

References

Soviet serial killers
Nicknames in crime